Kristian Platt (born 15 December 1991, Rock Ferry, Birkenhead) is a defender who plays for Cymru North side Colwyn Bay.

Platt made his professional debut as a 17-year-old substitute for Shaun Kelly against Darlington on 3 May 2009 in Chester's final match in The Football League following relegation. Prior to his debut, Platt had been linked to moves to Premier League clubs and had played for the first-team in a friendly match against Southport.

Platt joined AFC Telford United on 9 July 2014, meaning he would step up a league, moving into the Conference Premier.

He left Stalybridge Celtic at the end of the 2016/17 season and signed for Airbus UK Broughton.

He moved to Colwyn Bay in June 2021 from Airbus.

External links

References

1991 births
Sportspeople from Birkenhead
Living people
English footballers
English Football League players
National League (English football) players
Association football defenders
Chester City F.C. players
Stalybridge Celtic F.C. players
AFC Telford United players
Warrington Town F.C. players
Cymru Alliance players
Colwyn Bay F.C. players
Airbus UK Broughton F.C. players
Cymru North players
Bala Town F.C. players